Homeart was a national chain of retail stores with outlets in every state in Australia selling mostly homewares, giftware and electrical products.

History
The company's origins can be traced back to Melbourne's eastern suburbs and the iconic Croydon Stockyards (flea market) in 1970. On August 1st 1979, Mr and Mrs van Roest's first store to carry the name Copperart was opened on Canterbury Road, Blackburn, Victoria. This was followed soon after by another six stores.

Initially the business sold copper and brassware from around the world, as well as Grandfather clocks and wall clocks.
The name Copperart derives from the material the products were made from (Copper) and the name of the original founder Aart, 'Copper' and 'A(a)rt'.
Copperart initially sold mostly copper and brass products, but the company expanded in the 1980s to include a broader range of homewares.

2001: rebranding

By the year 2000, the product range in the Copperart stores had changed dramatically and bore little resemblance to original concept; the once famous copper and brass had virtually disappeared. In late 2001, Copperart changed its trading name to Homeart. It was felt that the "Copperart" name implied only a small range of copper and related products were stocked, when in fact the stores sold a wide range of products including manchester, clocks, electrical, homewares, dolls, furniture, sports & leisure and outdoor gear.

2010: logo update and changes
In mid-2010, Homeart updated its logo replacing the large roof with a smaller, more subtle one, giving it a more modern look. The font and colour were also changed to a more modern style and distinctive "Homeart" orange.

2015: Closure 
In January 2015 liquidators were appointed for the 116 Homeart stores, with the announcement made in March of that year that all stores would close, having failed to find a buyer for the business.

Advertising 
Through its regular use of television advertising, Copperart became an iconic Australian company. Copperart used the well-known Pete Smith, best remembered for his voiceovers on Sale of the Century. The Don Lane Show and In Melbourne Tonight, in television commercials during the 1990s. In the 2000s large catalogue distributions were the company's preferred choice of advertising, and television commercials ceased.
In late 2009, Homeart aired a television advertisement to promote its goods for the Christmas season.

Pop culture
Copperart was featured several times in the early 1990s on the sketch comedy show Fast Forward and The Late Show. The sketches were parodies of Copperart's television commercials with comedian Steve Vizard lampooning Pete Smith.

References

Copperart TV Commercial 1991
Copperart TV Commercial 1988

1977 establishments in Australia
Retail companies established in 1977
Defunct retail companies of Australia